Per-Inge Bengtsson (born 29 October 1961) is a Swedish sprint canoer who competed in the 1980s. Competing in two Summer Olympics, he won two silver medals at Los Angeles in 1984, earning them in the K-2 500 m and K-4 1000 m events.

Bengtsson also won seven medals at the ICF Canoe Sprint World Championships with two golds (K-4 1000 m: 1982, 1985), two silvers (K-4 500 m: 1981, K-4 1000 m: 1987), and three bronzes (K-2 500 m: 1987, K-4 500 m: 1982, 1985).

References

External links

1958 births
Canoeists at the 1984 Summer Olympics
Canoeists at the 1988 Summer Olympics
Living people
Olympic canoeists of Sweden
Olympic silver medalists for Sweden
Swedish male canoeists
Olympic medalists in canoeing
ICF Canoe Sprint World Championships medalists in kayak

Medalists at the 1984 Summer Olympics
20th-century Swedish people